Bethel Airport may refer to:

Bethel Airport in Bethel, Alaska, United States
Bethel Air Base, a former Army airfield that predated the airport
Bethel Regional Airport in Bethel, Maine, United States
Grimes Airport in Bethel, Pennsylvania, United States
Sullivan County International Airport in Bethel, New York, United States